Botinec is a neighborhood located in Novi Zagreb - zapad city district of Zagreb, Croatia. It is famous for having its streets named after famous character from Croatian theater plays and novels. It was founded in 1965 as a refugee camp after the 1964 flood, owing its rectangular street grid to the era of building Novi Zagreb (called Južni Zagreb – Southern Zagreb at the time). It was away from the city and away from Sava River, with barracks meant to serve as a camp only for up to six years, but the houses were eventually bought by the tenants and upgraded. Nonetheless, Botinec remains a neighborhood bearing the scar of the flood. Botinec is divided in two parts: Old Botinec and New Botinec. According to the 2001 census, Botinec had 4,906 inhabitants.

References 

Neighbourhoods of Zagreb
Populated places in the City of Zagreb
Novi Zagreb